Henry J. Janssen was a member of the Wisconsin State Assembly.

Biography
Janssen was born on November 6, 1876 in West De Pere, Wisconsin. On January 7, 1902, he married Ida Rupiper. They would have a daughter. Janssen was a member of the Knights of Columbus and the Catholic Order of Foresters. He died on April 4, 1922.

Career
Janssen was a member of the Assembly during the 1911, 1913, 1915 and 1917 sessions. He was a city councilman from 1901 to 1904 and again from 1907 to 1909. From October 1, 1911 to December 1, 1912, he was Deputy Register of Deeds of Brown County, Wisconsin. Other positions Janssen held include justice of the peace and city assessor, as well as member of the Brown County Board of Supervisors. He was a Democrat.

References

External links

Wisconsin Historical Society

People from De Pere, Wisconsin
Democratic Party members of the Wisconsin State Assembly
Wisconsin city council members
County supervisors in Wisconsin
American justices of the peace
20th-century Roman Catholics
1860 births
1922 deaths
Burials in Wisconsin
Catholics from Wisconsin